Sagar Jogiyani or Sagar Dipakbhai Jogiyani (born 20 June 1984) is an Indian cricketer. He is a right-handed opening batsman and wicketkeeper. He represents Saurashtra in first-class cricket, limited overs and twenty20 cricket.

References

Indian cricketers
Saurashtra cricketers
1984 births
Living people
Wicket-keepers